The term Middle or Central Pomerania can refer to two distinct areas, depending on whether it is used as a translation of the corresponding German or Polish terms Mittelpommern (also Mittelpommerscher Keil) or Pomorze Środkowe, respectively.

Mittelpommern
Mittelpommern in historical usage denotes the central parts of the former Duchy, later Province of Pomerania, located approximately between the rivers Peene and Rega, including the towns Trzebiatów, Resko and Nowogard.

Mittelpommerscher Keil 
Mittelpommerscher Keil (Middle Pomeranian Wedge) is a term used in ethnolinguistics, which carries a narrower meaning; it corresponds to the south-central part of Mittelpommern, roughly between the rivers Zarow and Ihna (Ina). This area differed from the rest of the duchy or province by the dialect of the inhabitants, who spoke the Mittelpommersch variety closely related to Märkisch-Brandenburgisch, as well as in the town law of the cities, which was Magdeburg Law (vs Lübeck Law in the other parts). Since World War II the Oder-Neisse line divides this area, reducing the German part to the former Uecker-Randow district, as well as to the Amt Gartz (Oder) in the Uckermark district.

Pomorze Środkowe
Pomorze Środkowe in modern usage are terms coined in Poland for the area of the former Koszalin Voivodeship (1950-1975), spanning roughly from the area east of the river Rega (Rega) to the river Łeba, which was split in 1975 with the remains since 1999 merged into the West Pomeranian, Pomeranian and Greater Poland voivodeships. In 2003, a movement presented to the Polish Sejm parliament a petition for the recreation of the Koszalin voivodeship as the Central Pomeranian Voivodeship, signed by 135,000 people.

See also
Pomerania
History of Pomerania
Eastern Pomerania (disambiguation)
Western Pomerania (disambiguation)
Vorpommern
Farther Pomerania
Zachodniopomorskie
Pomerelia

References

Słupsk
Regions of Poland
Pomerania

es:Pomerania Central